Français fondamental (French for Fundamental French) is a list of words and grammatical concepts, devised in the beginning of the 1950s for teaching foreigners and residents of the French Union, France's colonial empire. A series of investigations in the 1950s and 1960s showed that a small number of words are used the same way orally and in writing in all circumstances; thus a limited number of grammatical rules were necessary for a functional language.

Origins
Français fondamental was developed by the Centre d'Etude du Français Élémentaire, which was renamed to the Centre de Recherche et d'Etude pour la Diffusion du Français (CREDIF) in 1959. It was headed by linguist Georges Gougenheim. The Ministry of Education of France sanctioned and promoted it as a method of learning French. The use of français fondamental was common in French textbooks, and especially prevalent in audiovisual learning methods used in the 1960s.

Gougenheim, Réné Michea, Paul Rivenc, and Aurélien Sauvageot served as researchers for the project. There are 1,475 words in the "first degree" and 1,609 words in the "second degree."

See also 

 Basic English
Vocabolario di base ( in italian : Basic italian )

References

Further reading
 Gineste, Roger and R. Lagrave. Le français fondamental par l'action: Langage et vocabulaire. Section d'initiation à la langue française (ou Cours préparatoire 1re année) 1er degré. Méthode active et fonctionnelle destinée aux élèves dont la langue maternelle n'est pas le français. , 1961. (see entry in WorldCat)

External links
 Français Fondamental, corpus oraux, contenus d'enseignement 50 ans de travaux et d'enjeux Ecole normale supérieure Lettres et Sciences humaines, Lyon, France 8,9 et 10 décembre 2005 

Technical communication
French language
Simplified languages
1959 in France